Matthias Gate, or Matthias' Gate, is a gate between the first and the second courtyards of Prague Castle in Prague, Czech Republic. It was erected by Matthias, Holy Roman Emperor in 1614.

References

External links

 

Buildings and structures completed in 1614
Gates
Prague Castle
Matthias, Holy Roman Emperor